Rayville is a town in and the parish seat of Richland Parish in northeastern Louisiana, United States. The population, which is 69 percent African American, was 4,234 at the 2000 census, but it had declined by nearly 13 percent in 2010 to 3,695.

The City Hall, located next to the U.S. Post Office across from U.S. Highway 80, is named for former Rayville Mayor Joe Kalil (1922–1996).

History
Rayville was named for John Ray.

Geography
Rayville is located at  (32.473580, -91.757387).

According to the United States Census Bureau, the town has a total area of 2.3 square miles (5.9 km), of which 2.2 square miles (5.8 km) is land and 0.04 square mile (0.1 km) (1.32%) is water.

Demographics

2020 census

As of the 2020 United States census, there were 3,347 people, 1,248 households, and 892 families residing in the town.

2000 census
As of the census of 2000, there were 4,234 people, 1,504 households, and 1,004 families residing in the town. The racial makeup of the town was 31.44% White, 67.26% African American, 0.28% Native American, 0.17% Asian, 0.12% from other races, and 0.73% from two or more races. Hispanic or Latino of any race were 0.50% of the population.

There were 1,504 households, out of which 36.6% had children under the age of 18 living with them, 28.5% were married couples living together, 34.3% had a female householder with no husband present, and 33.2% were non-families. 30.1% of all households were made up of individuals, and 14.7% had someone living alone who was 65 years of age or older. The average household size was 2.65 and the average family size was 3.32.

In the town, the population was spread out, with 32.3% under the age of 18, 10.4% from 18 to 24, 22.8% from 25 to 44, 16.7% from 45 to 64, and 17.8% who were 65 years of age or older. The median age was 32 years. For every 100 females, there were 76.1 males. For every 100 females age 18 and over, there were 66.3 males.

The median income for a household in the town was $14,309, and the median income for a family was $16,480. Males had a median income of $21,000 versus $16,107 for females. The per capita income for the town was $8,589. About 44.2% of families and 48.8% of the population were below the poverty line, including 65.9% of those under age 18 and 28.6% of those age 65 or over.

Education
Public schools in Richland Parish are operated by the Richland Parish School Board. Three campuses serve the town of Rayville - Rayville Elementary School (Grades PK-6), Rayville Junior High School (Grades 7-8), and Rayville High School (Grades 9-12).  Rayville is also served by Riverfield Academy (Grades PK-12) a non-denominational private school.

Notable people
 Ralph Abraham, was elected in the 114th Congress to serve the 5th Congressional District of LA.
 Garland Boyette, football player
 Reggie Burnette, Green Bay Packers and Tampa Bay Buccaneers player
 Charles "Bubba" Chaney, state representative from Rayville
 Benny Gay Christian, state representative from Rayville, 1964 to 1974
 Bunny Greenhouse, U.S. Army Corps of Engineers whistleblower
 Elvin Hayes, NBA Hall of Fame basketball player
 Edgar Jones, Baltimore Ravens football player
 Ernie Ladd, professional wrestler and football player who played for the San Diego Chargers, Kansas City Chiefs, and the Houston Oilers. Inducted into the Chargers Hall of Fame in 1981 and the WWE Hall of Fame in 1995. He attended Grambling State University.
 Roosevelt Potts, Indianapolis Colts
 Stanley Williams, one of the early leaders of the Crips.

Gallery

References

External links
 Town of Rayville official website

Towns in Louisiana
Towns in Richland Parish, Louisiana
Parish seats in Louisiana